B&Q (short for Block & Quayle after the company's two founders) is a British multinational DIY and home improvement retailing company, headquartered in Eastleigh, England. It is a wholly owned subsidiary of Kingfisher plc. It was founded in March, 1969 by Richard Block and David Quayle.

History

1969 to 1979: Early growth
B&Q was founded in March 1969 in Southampton, England, by Richard Block and David Quayle, following the purchase and fitting out of a former furniture warehouse in the Southampton suburb of  Portswood. Originally called Block & Quayle, the duo soon shortened the brand to B&Q as stock delivery notes and invoices were already unofficially abbreviating the name.

By each working over sixty-hour, six-day weeks, they were able to repay their bank overdraft within six months of opening, with turnover reaching £1 million within the first five years of operating. The chain quickly expanded, and by 1979, there were twenty six shops across the United Kingdom.

Co-founder Richard Block left the company in 1976.

1980s: Buyout and further expansion
B&Q grew rapidly through a combination of mergers, acquisitions and expansions, such as the acquisition of a Hampshire UK based company Dodge City at the beginning of the 1980s. The chain was itself acquired by the F. W. Woolworth Company for £16.8m at the beginning of the 1980s, coinciding with David Quayle, who by that time had a personal wealth of £4 million, selling his share. 

Two years later, F. W. Woolworth's United Kingdom subsidiary (Woolworth's Ltd.) and B&Q were purchased by Paternoster, which became Kingfisher plc and was still B&Q's parent company .

B&Q developed two new trading formats: HomeCentres, retailing furniture, bathrooms, soft furniture, flooring and lighting; and AutoCentres, being similar to a Halfords, the first launch taking place at Cribbs Causeway, Bristol, at the end of the 1980s. The concept being to have a HomeCentre, AutoCentre and DIY Superstore with one communal car park. 

The forays into these new markets were relatively short lived, and the various sites were sold on a couple of years later. The AutoCentres becoming in the main 'Charlie Browns', the HomeCentres being sold off individually.

Since 1990
In the mid 1990s, B&Q opened a new format of shop known as the Depot (later changed to B&Q Depot), a forerunner of a new class of shop known as the B&Q Warehouse. The company also began to expand outside the United Kingdom. In 1995, the retailer opened their first overseas subsidiary in Taiwan, and in January 1996, the first overseas large home improvement centre in Taoyuan City, Taiwan. 

In September 1998, it acquired NOMI, Poland's leading chain of DIY shops, and later that year, merged with France's Castorama. 

In December 2000, Kingfisher plc acquired twenty eight development sites, intended to house future shops of rival chain Homebase from Sainsbury's, who sold the chain. The development sites instead housed shops of B&Q. In August 2001, B&Q opened its first shop in Shanghai, when it hoped to increase outlets from four to 58 by 2005.

B&Q opened its first shop in Hong Kong on 1 June 2007, but was scheduled to close it on 13 September 2009. In December 2007, Kingfisher sold its 50 per cent stake in B&Q Taiwan to its joint venture partner. The $106.5 million (£51.6 million) sale, producing a profit of £25m was used to reduce debt.

In March 2009, B&Q closed twenty two of its then sixty three shops in China, blaming the housing slump. In May 2011, B&Q agreed to acquire thirty one shops in the United Kingdom, from the administrators of Focus DIY for £23 million. During 2011, B&Q opened a new regional distribution centre, at G.Park in Swindon.

In 2020, B&Q announced a sales increase of 17.6pc to £3.5bn for the quarter to October 31, caused by the COVID-19 pandemic during which people spent money on home improvements.

In 2022 B&Q opened its first two shops in Saudi Arabia, in the capital, Riyadh.

Customers
B&Q were reported to have a customer base of seven million in July 2016, of which it was estimated 75% use the retailer's website to research their desired products, prior to purchasing in shop. B&Q operated a Diamond Club scheme which offered some benefits, but it was closed to new members in 2018.

Corporate affairs
The retail chain offers over 40,000 products across their three hundred shops and through their online presence. Reports in May 2007 suggested it was the second largest in Europe, and the fourth largest in the world (behind the Home Depot, Lowe's and OBI).

Shops

By 2000, B&Q had fifty one large warehouse shops; this had doubled by 2003. By May 2014, B&Q in the United Kingdom had 359 shops, and 20,887 employees; and eight shops in Ireland.

In March 2015, Kingfisher said it would close sixty B&Q shops in the United Kingdom and Ireland over the next two years, and a few loss-making shops elsewhere in Europe. It also said that B&Q UK and Ireland could adequately meet local customer needs, from fewer shops, and some shops should be smaller.

Financial performance
B&Q account for around a third of their parent company's revenues, seeing like for like sales increase by 5.6% in August 2016. In the year ending 31 January 2007, sales were £3.9 billion despite overall sales falling by 1.7% compared to the previous year, whilst profit was £162.9 million, a fall from £208.5m during the previous year. Profit fell further in the year ending 31 January 2008, to £131million.

In March 2013, it was reported that the retail chain's Ireland operation was making losses, with their then nine shops making a combined loss of £7m throughout 2012, yet its operations within the United Kingdom turned a profit despite an overall decrease in sales by 5.6%.

International operations

Outside the United Kingdom, B&Q's other international operations are in Ireland and, since 2022, in Saudi Arabia. On 31 January 2013, B&Q Ireland Ltd filed for examinership in the Irish courts and PWC Ireland was appointed examiner, though shops continued to trade while alternative financing arrangements were made.

B&Q Ireland had been making a loss since two years before, although the shops in the United Kingdom continued to stay in profit. The chain exited examinership a few months later in May 2013, following High Court approval for investment totalling €2.4 million to allow eight of their nine shops to continue operating.

B&Q expanded into China during 1999, building up a chain of nearly forty shops, but opted to sell a 70% controlling stake of operations in China in 2015, due to poor sales. B&Q's parent company had previously sold its 50% stake in B&Q Taiwan in 2007 in order to focus on what was then a rapidly growing business in China.

Incidents
In June 2001, in Poole, Dorset, 69 year old customer Pamela Jean Hinchliffe was fatally crushed by a forklift at the firm's Fleetsbridge shop. In June 2004, B&Q were found guilty of causing her death, and the following month they were fined £550,000.

In July 2017, B&Q faced widespread criticism from customers complaining of bad smells and headaches after painting their homes with Valspar paint sold to them. This led to B&Q compensating hundreds of customers, with the problem said to be caused by bacterial contamination in the can causing emission of hydrogen sulphide and ammonia.

References

External links

 Official website

Home improvement companies of the United Kingdom
Garden centres
Companies based in Hampshire
Retail companies established in 1969
1969 establishments in the United Kingdom
F. W. Woolworth Company
Kingfisher plc
British brands